Challhöchi stands for:

 Mountain between Metzerlen and Röschenz in Switzerland, see Chall Pass
 Mountain Pass between Eptingen and Hauenstein in Switzerland, see Challhöchi Pass